The discography of Eternal, a British female R&B and pop group, consists of four studio albums, five compilation albums, one remix album, two video albums and twenty-two singles on EMI Records.

In 1993 they released their debut single "Stay", which reached the top 5 in the United Kingdom and Australia (where it was certified Gold); it also reached the top 20 in Ireland, New Zealand and the US. In the US, "Stay", sold 220,000 copies as of December 1994. The group's debut album Always & Forever produced six top 20 singles in the UK, including "So Good" which was a number one hit in Ireland. Released in November 1993, Always & Forever peaked at number 2, and made Eternal the first all-female group to sell over a million copies of an album in the UK, being certified 4× Platinum by March 1995. As of 1997, the album has sold 4 million copies worldwide.

Eternal's second album Power of a Woman was released in October 1995 and certified 2× Platinum in March 1996. Peaking at number 6 in the UK, the album produced four top 10 singles; including the top 5 hit, "Power of a Woman", which was Gold-certified in Australia; plus "I Am Blessed" which peaked at number 7 in the UK. As of February 1997, Power of a Woman has sold 2 million copies worldwide.

Before the Rain, their third album, was released in March 1997, with first week sales exceeding 100,000 copies in the UK alone. It contained the group's highest-charting singles in the UK; "Don't You Love Me" and the number-one hit "I Wanna Be the Only One" (featuring BeBe Winans), which was a top 10 hit in twelve territories. Before the Rain was certified Platinum in the UK, whilst "I Wanna Be the Only One" received Platinum certifications from the British Phonographic Industry and Norwegian branch of the International Federation of the Phonographic Industry. As of June 2019, "I Wanna Be the Only One" is ranked number 28 on the UK Official Charts Company's Top 100 girl band singles of the last 25 years.

In October 1997, the group released Greatest Hits, which peaked at number 2 and was certified 3× Platinum in the UK. The compilation also received Platinum certifications in New Zealand and Norway. "Angel of Mine", released as the sole single from the compilation, was a top 5 hit in the UK and Norway (where it was certified Gold); whilst the 1999 cover by American recording artist Monica peaked at number 1 in the US. Eternal released their self-titled fourth album in November 1999, peaking at number 87. "What'cha Gonna Do", the album's sole single, peaked at number 16 in the UK and appeared on the German, Swedish and Dutch singles charts. Eternal has sold over 10 million albums, with Always & Forever (15), Power of a Woman (25) and Before the Rain (35) ranked in the UK Official Charts Company's Top 40 biggest girl band studio albums of the last 25 years.

Albums

Studio albums

Compilation albums

Remix albums

Video albums

Singles

Promotional singles

Notes

References

Discographies of British artists